Michela Monari  (born ) is Italian female volleyball player. She was part of the Italy women's national volleyball team.

She participated in the 1994 FIVB Volleyball Women's World Championship. She played at the 1997 Women's European Volleyball Championship. On club level she played with Anthesis Modena. Oggi Michela allena nella Robur et Fides.

Clubs
 Anthesis Modena (1994)

References

External links
http://www.legavolleyfemminile.it/?page_id=194&idat=MON-MIC-73
http://www.cev.lu/Competition-Area/PlayerDetails.aspx?TeamID=2331&PlayerID=20278&ID=37

1973 births
Living people
Italian women's volleyball players
Place of birth missing (living people)